Haemodorum laxum is a plant in the Haemodoraceae (blood root) family, native to Western Australia, and was first described by Robert Brown in 1810.

It is a perennial, herb, growing from 0.6-1.4 m high.

References

laxum
Flora of Western Australia
Taxa named by Robert Brown (botanist, born 1773)
Plants described in 1810